Bossio is a surname of Spanish origin. It is similar to Bosio.

List of people with the surname 

 Agustín Bossio (born 1983), Argentine football Goalkeeper
 Ángel Bossio (1905–1978), Argentine football Goalkeeper
 Bill Bossio (1928–2016), American boxer
 Carlos Bossio (born 1973), Argentine professional footballer
 Diego Bossio (born 1979), Argentine economist
 Lucas Bossio (born 1990), Argentine professional footballer
 Miguel Bossio (born 1960), Uruguayan footballer
 Mike Bossio (born 1960 or 1961), Canadian politician
 Paula Bossio, Australian author and illustrator
 Sara Bossio (born 1938), Uruguayan lawyer and former judge

Surnames
Surnames of Spanish origin
Spanish-language surnames